WXMK (105.9 FM) is a radio station broadcasting a hot adult contemporary format. Licensed to Dock Junction, Georgia, United States, the station serves the Brunswick area. Better known as Magic 105.9 "The Golden Isles' Number 1 Hit Music Station." The station is currently owned by Golden Isles Broadcasting, LLC.

References

External links
Magic 105.9 official website

Golden Isles Broadcasting, LLC

XMK